Lebanon bologna is a type of cured, smoked, and fermented semidry beef sausage; it is not, in spite of its name, a pork-based bologna. Similar in appearance and texture to salami, it is somewhat darker in color, and is typically served as a cold cut or appetizer. 

Lebanon bologna has a distinct, tangy flavor, more so than other generally similar fermented meat products such as summer sausage. Hardwood smoking imparts a strong smokiness to the traditionally prepared versions of the product; increasingly, liquid smoke is used as a substitute  for this costly time- and labor-intensive process.

Origin 
Lebanon bologna was developed by the Pennsylvania Dutch of Lebanon County, Pennsylvania, prior to the 1780s and was a common item by the early 1800s, reflecting the slow-cured and smoked sausage traditions of Western Europe. Still produced primarily in that area, it is found in markets throughout the United States and typically served as a cold cut and as an appetizer.  In addition to the original, a sweet version is made.

Manufacture 
Typically, curing salts are added to the ground and spiced beef to control microbial growth during processing. The blended and stuffed sausage is then aged for 10 days prior to smoking to enrich lactic acid bacteria and allow for the reduction of nitrate to nitrite.  Fermentation occurs during a slow cold smoke (kept at a temperature below ) that can last for up to four days.  A one pH unit (or more) decline is observed during this step, as well as the development of nitrosohemochrome, the pigment responsible for the red color of cured meats.

See also 

 List of smoked foods

References

External links 

 Seltzer's Lebanon Bologna homepage
 Godshall Meats homepage
 Cook's Thesaurus: Cold Cuts

American sausages
Lunch meat
Lebanon, Pennsylvania
Pennsylvania Dutch cuisine
Smoked meat